The 1914 United States House of Representatives elections in South Carolina were held on November 3, 1914 to select seven Representatives for two-year terms from the state of South Carolina.  The primary elections were held on August 25 and the runoff elections were held two weeks later on September 8.  All seven incumbents were re-elected and the composition of the state delegation remained solely Democratic.

1st congressional district
Incumbent Democratic Congressman Richard S. Whaley of the 1st congressional district, in office since 1913, defeated E.J. Dennis in the Democratic primary and two minor candidates in the general election.

Democratic primary

General election results

|-
| 
| colspan=5 |Democratic hold
|-

2nd congressional district
Incumbent Democratic Congressman James F. Byrnes of the 2nd congressional district, in office since 1911, defeated C.M. Mixon in the Democratic primary and was unopposed in the general election.

Democratic primary

General election results

|-
| 
| colspan=5 |Democratic hold
|-

3rd congressional district
Incumbent Democratic Congressman Wyatt Aiken of the 3rd congressional district, in office since 1903, won the Democratic primary and was unopposed in the general election.

Democratic primary

General election results

|-
| 
| colspan=5 |Democratic hold
|-

4th congressional district
Incumbent Democratic Congressman Joseph T. Johnson of the 4th congressional district, in office since 1901, won the Democratic primary and defeated two minor candidates in the general election.

Democratic primary

General election results

|-
| 
| colspan=5 |Democratic hold
|-

5th congressional district
Incumbent Democratic Congressman David E. Finley of the 5th congressional district, in office since 1899, defeated W.F. Stevenson in the Democratic primary and was unopposed in the general election.

Democratic primary

General election results

|-
| 
| colspan=5 |Democratic hold
|-

6th congressional district
Incumbent Democratic Congressman J. Willard Ragsdale of the 6th congressional district, in office since 1913, won the Democratic primary and was unopposed in the general election.

Democratic primary

General election results

|-
| 
| colspan=5 |Democratic hold
|-

7th congressional district
Incumbent Democratic Congressman Asbury Francis Lever of the 7th congressional district, in office since 1901, defeated two minor candidates in the general election.

General election results

|-
| 
| colspan=5 |Democratic hold
|-

See also
United States House of Representatives elections, 1914
South Carolina gubernatorial election, 1914
South Carolina's congressional districts

References

"Report of the Secretary of State to the General Assembly of South Carolina.  Part II." Reports and Resolutions of the General Assembly of the State of South Carolina. Volume IV. Columbia, SC: 1915, p. 338.

United States House of Representatives
1914
South Car